Polydefkis Volanakis (born 25 April 2003) is a Greek professional footballer who plays as a centre-back for Fortuna Liga club Zemplín Michalovce.

Career

MFK Zemplín Michalovce
Volanakis made his Fortuna Liga debut for Zemplín Michalovce against Pohronie on 30 April 2022. He netted his first goal for Zemplín in the 50th minute of the match against AS Trenčín on 21 May 2022.

References

External links
 MFK Zemplín Michalovce official club profile 
 
 
 Futbalnet profile 

2003 births
Living people
Footballers from Thessaloniki
Greek footballers
Greek expatriate footballers
Association football defenders
MFK Zemplín Michalovce players
Slovak Super Liga players
Expatriate footballers in Slovakia
Greek expatriate sportspeople in Slovakia
Aris Thessaloniki F.C. players